Oxana Makeyeva (born 5 September 1984) is a Kazakhstani female water polo player. She was a member of the Kazakhstan women's national water polo team.

She competed at the 2007 World Aquatics Championships.

References

External links 
 Oxana Makeyeva of Kazakhstan (R) and Heather Petri of the U.S. (L) fight for the ball, REUTERS/Nir Elias
 Oxana Makeyeva of Kazakhstan is defended by Brenda Villa ... Getty Images

Living people
1984 births
Kazakhstani female water polo players
21st-century Kazakhstani women